Anna Lucia de Amicis (c. 1733–1816) was an Italian soprano. She debuted in J. C. Bach's Orione in London, and went on to sing as prima donna in Dublin, Innsbruck and Naples. In Innsbruck she sang the female title role in Romolo ed Ersilia, the marriage celebration opera written by Johann Adolf Hasse for the marriage of Leopold of Habsburg and Spanish Infanta Maria Ludovica. For this role she gained a noted reputation. She was a favourite of both W. A. Mozart and his father, Leopold, and created the role of Giunia in Lucio Silla (Milan 1772).

References

Italian operatic sopranos
Year of birth uncertain
1816 deaths
18th-century Italian women opera singers